Nealcidion privatum is a species of beetle in the family Cerambycidae. It was described by Pascoe in 1866.

References

Nealcidion
Beetles described in 1866